Up-regulated during skeletal muscle growth protein 5 (USMG5), also known as ATP synthase membrane subunit DAPIT (ATP5MD), Diabetes-associated protein in insulin-sensitive tissues, or HCV F-transactivated protein 2 is a protein that in humans is encoded by the USMG5 gene.

Structure
The USMG5 gene is located on the q arm of chromosome 10 at position 24.33 and it spans 7,463 base pairs. The USMG5 gene produces a 6.46 kDa protein composed of 58 amino acids. USMG5 is a small subunit of the mitochondrial ATP synthase (complex V), as well as the lysosomal V-ATPase. The protein is associated with the ATP synthase in a stoichiometric manner. The structure of the protein contains a putative transmembrane segment and a single presumed α-helix that spans from amino acid 23 to 45. The structure has been found to be similar to its putative yeast ortholog.

Function
The human USMG5 gene codes for a protein with a role in maintaining and regulating the ATP synthase population in the mitochondria. The protein is responsible for several minor roles that are expendable for the core function of complex V. A knockdown of the protein has been shown to lead to reduced ATP synthesis rate and CV dimer expression, while the wild type has been shown to boost the dimerization of complex V as well as enhance the ATP synthesis rate.

Clinical Significance
Mutations in USMG5 has been found to result in mitochondrial deficiencies and associated disorders of the mitochondrial ATP synthase (complex V). Homozygous splice-site mutations (c.87 + 1G>C) in the Ashkenazi Jewish population have been associated with cases of leigh syndrome caused by the decrease of Complex V dimerization and ATP synthesis. Leigh syndrome is a heterogeneous mitochondrial oxidative phosphorylation (OXPHOS) disease that is characterized by psychomotor retardation and necrotizing lesions in the brain.

Interactions
USMG5 is a component of the ATP synthase complex, and has co-complex interactions with ATP5F1, ATP5MC1, TP5F1E, ATP5H, ATP5ME, ATP5J, ATP5J2, and others.

References 

Human genes
Human proteins